Ailsa may refer to:

People
Ailsa (name), including a list of people with the name
Marquess of Ailsa, title in the Peerage of the United Kingdom created in 1831

Places
Ailsa Craig, an island in the outer Firth of Clyde, Scotland
Ailsa Craig, Ontario, North Middlesex, Ontario, Canada
Ailsa Craig (South Orkney Islands)
Ailsa Farms, New Jersey, U.S.

Other uses
Ailsa (car) (1907–1910), car manufactured in Glasgow by Hugh Kennedy & Company
Ailsa Bay Distillery, a whisky distillery, co-located with the Girvan distillery and owned by William Grant & Sons
Ailsa Course, a golf course in Scotland, near Ailsa Craig
Ailsa (film), a 1994 Irish film
Ailsa Craig Engines, manufacturer of marine and specialist made to order engines from 1891 to 1972
Ailsa Shipbuilding Company, shipbuilding company based in Troon, Scotland
Ailsa Stewart, fictional character in the Australian soap opera Home and Away
Volvo Ailsa B55, double-decker bus chassis built in Scotland 
Ailsa Craig, a variety of tomato

See also
Alisa (disambiguation)
Elsa (disambiguation)